Coen Niesten (born 30 August 1938) is a Dutch former professional racing cyclist. He rode the 1960 and 1961 Tour de France.

References

External links
 

1938 births
Living people
Dutch male cyclists
Sportspeople from Beverwijk
Cyclists from North Holland